Glodean Beverly White (born Glodean Beverly James, October 16, 1946) is an American R&B singer, who was married to Barry White.  In the 1980s, Glodean White made numerous appearances on Soul Train and the Soul Train Music Awards.  She was also part of the singing trio Love Unlimited.

Personal life 
In 1974, she married Barry White. They had four children together and collaborated on the 1981 album Barry & Glodean. The couple had been separated many years prior to his death in 2003 but they never divorced.

Discography
Barry & Glodean (1981)

References

1946 births
Living people
American rhythm and blues singers
The Love Unlimited Orchestra members